Maino may refer to:

Maino (rapper), American rapper from New York
Maino (cycling team), a cycling team that existed from 1912 to 1936
Maino (cycling team, 1965), a cycling team that existed in 1965
Maino (Angola), a periodic stream
Juan Maino, Chilean photographer and political activist